Jesús Galván Muñoz (born 17 April 1955) is a Mexican lawyer and politician affiliated with the National Action Party. As of 2014 he served as Senator of the LVIII and LIX Legislatures of the Mexican Congress representing the Federal District.

References

1955 births
Living people
Politicians from Jalisco
20th-century Mexican lawyers
Members of the Senate of the Republic (Mexico)
National Action Party (Mexico) politicians
National Autonomous University of Mexico alumni
People from Lagos de Moreno, Jalisco
21st-century Mexican politicians